Latha Mathavan Engineering College is a private reputed engineering college at Kidaripatti, Alagar Kovil, Madurai,Tamil Nadu, India established in 2007. It is a technical institution offering undergraduate programs in various disciplines of engineering. The college is located in Kidaripatti, Alagar Kovil, Madurai. This college is run by Karuppiah Pillai Theivanai Ammal Educational Trust.

Undergraduate courses (4 years) 
Bachelor of Engineering degree in
Computer Science and Engineering,
Civil Engineering
Electronics and Communication Engineering,
Electrical and Electronics Engineering,
Mechanical Engineering

References

External links 
 

All India Council for Technical Education
Engineering colleges in Tamil Nadu
Colleges in Madurai
Engineering colleges in Madurai
Science and technology in Madurai